Teneil Throssell, known professionally as HAAi, is an Australian electronic producer and DJ from Karratha, Western Australia. 

Throssell began her musical career in a series of rock bands, eventually moving to the UK as part of duo Dark Bells. She began DJing only after the band split up, going on to hold a residency at club Phonox in London from late 2016 for two years.

HAAi gained wider prominence after winning the BBC Radio 1 Essential Mix of the Year 2018.

She released her debut EP in November 2019 with Systems Up, Windows Down. This was followed-up by her debut album, Baby, We're Ascending, in May 2022. She has collaborated with various other electronic artists, including Fred Again and Jon Hopkins.

Throssell has ADHD.

Discography

Albums

EPs

References

Further reading

Australian electronic musicians
Musicians from Western Australia